It was a Dacian fortified town.

References

Dacian fortresses in Argeș County
Historic monuments in Argeș County
History of Muntenia